Twilight Ridge (March 20, 1983 – April 2, 2013) was an American Thoroughbred racing filly. In 1985, she won the Breeders' Cup Juvenile Fillies. At the time of her death (age 30), she was the oldest living female Breeders' Cup winner. Her offspring brought $2,295,000 at auction.

Pedigree

References

1985 Breeders' Juvenile Fillies

1983 racehorse births
2013 racehorse deaths
Racehorses bred in Florida
Racehorses trained in the United States
Breeders' Cup Juvenile Fillies winners
Thoroughbred family 20-c